Tyler Badie (born February 7, 2000) is an American football running back for the Denver Broncos of the National Football League (NFL). He played college football at Missouri.

Early life and high school
Badie was born and lived in New Orleans until his family was displaced by Hurricane Katrina in 2005 and moved to Randallstown, Maryland. Growing up, he was a sprinter for the Owings Mills Track Club and competed in the 2011 AAU Junior Olympics. Badie's family moved to Memphis, Tennessee following his junior year of high school after his mother accepted a job there and he transferred to Briarcrest Christian School. As a junior, Badie rushed for 400 yards and three touchdowns on 40 carries. Badie rushed the ball 193 times for 1,186 yards and scored 18 touchdowns in his senior season.

College career
Badie played in 12 games as a freshman and finished the season with 437 yards and two touchdowns on 89 carries and 809 all-purpose yards and was named to the Southeastern Conference (SEC) All-Freshman team. He rushed for 457 yards and led Missouri with 32 receptions for 356 yards and five touchdowns. As a junior, Badie rushed for 242 yards on 48 attempts with four touchdowns while also catching 28 passes for 333 yards and two touchdowns.

College statistics

College awards and honors
Second-team All-American (2021)
First-team All-SEC (2021)

Professional career

Baltimore Ravens
Badie was selected by the Baltimore Ravens in the sixth round, 196th overall, of the 2022 NFL Draft. He was waived on August 30, 2022, and signed to the practice squad the next day.

Denver Broncos
On December 29, 2022, Badie was signed by the Denver Broncos off the practice squad of the Baltimore Ravens.

References

External links
 Baltimore Ravens bio
Missouri Tigers bio

2000 births
Living people
American football running backs
Missouri Tigers football players
Players of American football from New Orleans
Baltimore Ravens players
Denver Broncos players